Dorothy Lawrence (4 October 1896 – 4 October 1964) was an English journalist who posed as a male soldier to report from the front line during World War I. In 1915, she went to France, where she managed to obtain a military uniform and a false identity. Upon her arrival in 
Albert, Somme, she found a soldier who took her to the front lines. However, trench life affected her health, and after ten days, she revealed her sex, afraid that if she needed medical attention her true identity would be discovered and those who helped her would be punished. She was arrested and interrogated, suspected of being a spy or a prostitute. She was then sent home under a strict agreement not to write about her experiences.

After the war, Lawrence published a memoir, but it was highly censored and not very successful. Her health began to fail, and she was committed to a mental institution, where she died 40 years later. In 2003, her story was rediscovered. Her book was reprinted and the Imperial War Museum included her experiences in an exhibition on women at war. Since 2015, several plays and films have been produced based on her story.

Early life
Lawrence was born in Hendon, Middlesex, of parents unknown. Probably illegitimate, she was adopted as a baby by a guardian of the Church of England.

There is some discrepancy in her parentage. The Oxford Dictionary of National Biography (which at time of publication in 2004 did not mention details of her life after 1919) reports that Lawrence was born on 4 October 1896 in Polesworth, Warwickshire and was the second daughter of Thomas Hartshorn Lawrence and Mary Jane Beddall. Other sources confirm this information and specify that Dorothy's parents were not married. Because she was therefore illegitimate, when her mother died in 1909, the teenage girl was adopted by wealthy and respected church guardians Mrs Josephine Fitzgerald and her husband in Salisbury.

War correspondent
Wanting to be a journalist, she managed to have some articles published in The Times and in Nash's Pall Mall Magazine. When the war started, she wrote to a number of the Fleet Street newspapers offering her services as a war correspondent. She believed that this would be the best way to gain recognition for her talents, but no paper would send a woman to the front lines. In fact, they couldn't get access for even experienced male correspondents.

Travelling to France in 1915, she tried to join the Voluntary Aid Detachment but was rejected. While attempting to enter the war zone via the French sector as a freelancer, she was arrested by French Police in Senlis,  short of the front line, and ordered to leave. Spending the night sleeping on a haystack in a forest, she returned to Paris, where she concluded that only by disguising herself as a man could she get her story:

Transformation

Lawrence persuaded two British Army soldiers she met in a Paris café to smuggle her a khaki uniform, piece by piece, within their washing; she called the ten men who eventually shared in this exploit her "khaki accomplices". She then practised transforming herself into a male soldier, by: flattening her figure with a home-made corset; using sacking and cotton-wool to bulk out her shoulders; and persuading two Scottish military policemen to cut her hair in a short military style. She darkened her complexion with Condy’s Fluid, a disinfectant made from potassium permanganate; scraped the pale skin of her cheeks to produce a shaving rash; and added a tan using shoe polish. Then she asked her soldier friends to teach her how to drill and march.

Wearing a blanket coat and no underwear, so no one could discover her abandoned petticoats, she obtained forged identity papers as Private Denis Smith of the 1st Bn, Leicestershire Regiment and headed for the front lines.

Front line
She set out for the British sector of the Somme by bicycle. On her way towards Albert, Somme, she met Lancashire coalminer turned British Expeditionary Force (BEF) tunnel-digging sapper Tom Dunn, who offered to assist her. Fearing for the safety of a lone woman amongst female-companionship starved soldiers, Dunn found Lawrence an abandoned cottage in Senlis Forest to sleep in. During her time on the frontline, she returned there each night to sleep on a damp mattress, fed by any rations that Dunn and his colleagues could spare.

Dunn found her work as a sapper with the 179 Tunnelling Company, 51st Division, Royal Engineers, a specialist mine-laying company that operated within  of the front line. Lawrence wrote that she was involved in the digging of tunnels. But later evidence and correspondence from the time after her discovery by British Army authorities, including from the files of Sir Walter Kirke of the BEF's secret service, suggest that she did not undertake this highly skilled digging work, but was at liberty and working within the trenches. Historian Simon Jones, an expert on the Somme tunnels, believes that Dorothy was not actually tunnelling under the front line but thinks there is no doubt that she was in the trenches disguised as a man.

Due to the stress of the situation, Lawrence developed constant chills and rheumatism, then fainting fits. After 10 days of service, to protect the men who had helped her, she revealed herself to be female and the commanding sergeant promptly placed her under arrest.

Return to England
Taken to the BEF headquarters and interrogated as a spy by a colonel, she was declared a prisoner of war. From there she was taken cross country by horse to Third Army headquarters in Calais, where she was interrogated by six generals and approximately twenty other officers. She was ignorant of the term camp follower (one meaning of which is "prostitute") and she later recalled "We talked steadily at cross purposes. On my side I had not been informed what the term meant, and on their side they continued unaware that I remained ignorant! So I often appeared to be telling lies."

From Calais she was taken to Saint-Omer and further interrogated. The Army was embarrassed that a woman had breached security and was fearful of more women taking on male roles during the war if her story got out. Fearing that she might divulge sensitive intelligence, a judge ordered that she remain in France until after the Battle of Loos. Held within the Convent de Bon Pasteur, she was also made to swear not to write about her experiences and signed an affidavit to that effect to keep from being sent to jail. Sent back to London, she travelled across the English Channel on the same ferry as activist Emmeline Pankhurst, who asked her to speak at a suffragette meeting.

Once in London, she tried to write about her experiences for The Wide World Magazine, but had to scrap her first book on the instructions of the War Office, which invoked the 1914 Defence of the Realm Act to silence her. She later commented:

The National Archives have two medal index cards for Lawrence confirming her participation in the war: one showing her rank of Sapper with the Royal Engineers and another showing her as a Worker in the Queen Mary's Army Auxiliary Corps.

Later life
In 1919, she moved to Canonbury, Islington, and published an account of her experiences: Sapper Dorothy Lawrence: The Only English Woman Soldier. Although well received in England, America and Australia, it was heavily censored by the War Office, and it did not become the commercial success that she wanted.

By 1925 her increasingly erratic behaviour was brought to the attention of the authorities. After confiding to a doctor that she had been raped as a teenager by her church guardian Mr Fitzgerald, and with no contact from Mrs Fitzgerald or other family to look after her, she was taken into care and later deemed insane. Committed first to the London County Mental Hospital at Hanwell in March 1925, she was later institutionalised at the Colney Hatch Lunatic Asylum in Friern Barnet, north London. She apparently did not have any visitors and died at what was by then known as Friern Hospital in 1964. She was buried in a pauper's grave in New Southgate Cemetery.

Legacy
In 2003, Richard Bennett, the grandson of Richard Samson Bennett – one of the soldiers who had helped Lawrence in France – found her autobiography while researching his family history at the Royal Engineers Museum (REM) in Chatham, Kent.

On further investigation, East Sussex historian Raphael Stipic found a letter written during World War I by Sir Walter Kirke, head of the secret service for the British Expeditionary Force. The letter mentioned a woman who dressed in men's clothing in hopes of becoming a war correspondent, pointing clearly to Lawrence.

Military historian Simon Jones then found a copy of Lawrence's book at the REM and started collecting notes to write a biography. Jones later found that Lawrence's rape allegations were sufficiently compelling to be included in her medical records, held in the London Metropolitan Archives but not available for general access.

Her story later became part of an Imperial War Museum exhibition covering women at war. Curator Laura Clouting stated that Lawrence was included because she was the exception to the rule that women were not included in any branch of the military.

Several plays and films have been produced based on Lawrence's story:

 The Disappearance of Dorothy Lawrence (2015), play written by Julie McNamara and directed by Paulette Randall.
 Blue Pen (2016), film by McNamara based on the stories of Lawrence and other women journalists whose voices were silenced through censorship, confinement in institutions, and abuse.
 Over the Top: the true-life tale of Dorothy Lawrence (2016), play written and directed by Lizzie Crarer, a production of theatre company The Heroine Project Presents, which offers stories of women who have been overlooked in history. 
 After a trustee of the Historical Association (HA) saw a performance of Over the Top, the HA commissioned the theatre company to create three short films about Lawrence to use in classroom discussions about World War I. The films were posted on the HA website in May 2017.

Sources
 Dorothy Lawrence (1919), Sapper Dorothy Lawrence: the only English woman soldier, Late Royal Engineers 51st Division 179th Tunnelling Company BEF, London:Lane. Available in-full online, includes additional pictures. Reissued in hardcover  and paperback  as Sapper Dorothy: the Only English Woman Soldier in the Royal Engineers 51st Division, 79th Tunnelling Co. During the First World War by Leonaur, 2010.

References

British women in World War I
People from Hendon
English adoptees
English journalists
English expatriates in France
Women war correspondents
Female wartime cross-dressers
Royal Engineers soldiers
English autobiographers
1896 births
1964 deaths
Women soldiers
Women autobiographers
British Army personnel of World War I
Royal Leicestershire Regiment soldiers
Military personnel from Middlesex